The Château des Milandes is a manor house in the commune of Castelnaud-la-Chapelle in the Dordogne département of France. Built by François de Caumont around 1489, it was, until 1535, the main house of the lords of Caumont, who preferred to live in this manor house instead of the large, uncomfortable medieval castle of Château de Castelnaud-la-Chapelle.

In 1940, the entertainer Josephine Baker rented the château and then bought it in 1947.

It has been listed as a monument historique by the French Ministry of Culture since 1986.

See also
List of castles in France

References

External links 

 
 
 France Direct Château des Milandes (Josephine Baker's "Village of the World")

Castles in Nouvelle-Aquitaine
Châteaux in Dordogne
Monuments historiques of Dordogne
Historic house museums in Nouvelle-Aquitaine
Music museums in France
Museums in Dordogne
Maisons des Illustres